Chihilsitoon (meaning "Forty Columns"), also spelled Chehel Sutoon, Chelsutoon, Chihil Sutun or Chihilsutoon, is an area in southern Kabul, Afghanistan, part of District 7.

History 
It is named after the Chihilsitoon Palace, a garden and pavilion that was originally built at the same location by then-Emir Abdur Rahman Khan at the end of the 19th century. Historic maps also refer to both the palace and area as Hendaki.

The palace's commemorative plaque was set in 1888. It was expanded with paved walkways and marble fountains by his successor Habibullah Khan. It had been used at times as a state guesthouse during the 20th century, notably being the visiting residence of U.S. President Dwight Eisenhower and Soviet leader Nikita Khrushchev, and during the communist era, was used as a government media hub. The site was heavily damaged by civil war and laid in ruins for years, before it was fully rebuilt and reopened in 2019.

Chihilsitoon is located in the outskirts of the city's urban area, just east from the Kabul River that streams south towards Char Asiab. The Chihilsitoon Road links it towards central Kabul to the north and Darulaman to the west. Like other places of District 7, it is an unplanned area and generally poor.

See also 
 Gardens of Babur

References

External links 
 Chihilsitoon Garden by Aga Khan Trust for Culture (video Feb. 14, 2019)
 Chihilsitoon Garden and Palace rehabilitation (video Sept. 19, 2018)

Neighborhoods of Kabul
Palaces in Afghanistan
Royal residences in Afghanistan
Buildings and structures in Afghanistan
Gardens in Afghanistan